The 2014–15 Mississippi State Bulldogs basketball team represented Mississippi State University in the 2014–15 NCAA Division I men's basketball season. The team's head coach was Rick Ray, in his third season at Mississippi State. The team played their home games at the Humphrey Coliseum in Starkville, Mississippi as a member of the Southeastern Conference. They finished the season 13–19, 6–12 in SEC play to finish in a tie for 11th place. They lost in the first round of the SEC tournament to Auburn.

On March 21, head coach Rick Ray was fired. He had a three-year record of 37–60.

Before the season

Departures
The Bulldogs lost eight players from the 2013–14 team.

Recruits

The Bulldogs also added two walk-ons, Isaiah Butler and Jeffery Johnson, who will be classified as seniors for the season.

Roster

Schedule and results

|-
!colspan=9 style="background:#762123; color:#D1D5D8;"| Exhibition

|-
!colspan=9 style="background:#762123; color:#D1D5D8;"| Non-Conference games

|-
!colspan=9 style="background:#762123; color:#D1D5D8;"| Conference games

|-
!colspan=9 style="background:#762123; color:#D1D5D8;"| SEC tournament

See also
2014–15 Mississippi State Lady Bulldogs basketball team

References

Mississippi State Bulldogs men's basketball seasons
Mississippi State
Mississippi State Bulldogs basketball
Mississippi State Bulldogs basketball